John Pierre Jahant (April 4, 1959 – May 19, 2010) was an American curler.

At the national level, he was a 1985 United States men's curling champion curler.

Teams

References

External links

1959 births
2010 deaths
American male curlers
American curling champions
Place of birth missing